The Avro Type 584 Avocet  was a British single-engined naval fighter prototype, designed and built by Avro. While the Avocet was not built in numbers, one of the prototypes was used as a seaplane trainer for the Royal Air Force's (RAF) High Speed Flight.

Design and development
The Avro 584 Avocet was designed by Avro's chief designer, Roy Chadwick to meet the requirements of Specification 17/25 for a Naval fighter. It was a single-engined, all-metal biplane, powered by a 230 hp Armstrong Siddeley Lynx engine, having interchangeable wheels and floats. Although it did not have folding wings, it was designed to be easily dismantled for storage on board ship.

Two prototypes were built, the first flying as a landplane in December 1927 and the second prototype flying as a seaplane in April 1928. Both prototypes were evaluated for the Fleet Air Arm at RAF Martlesham Heath, where, owing to the low-powered engine, their performance was seen to be unimpressive, and it was not ordered into production.

Operational history
Although no production occurred, the second prototype was used by the RAF's High Speed Flight at Calshot as a seaplane trainer for Schneider Trophy pilots.

Operators

Royal Air Force
High Speed Flight RAF

Specifications (Avocet (Wheeled undercarriage))

See also

References

External links

 Avro Avocet – British Aircraft Directory

1920s British fighter aircraft
Avocet
Single-engined tractor aircraft
Biplanes
Aircraft first flown in 1927